iTunes Originals – Sarah McLachlan is a 2005 digital download-only compilation album by Sarah McLachlan, released exclusively on iTunes. These tracks include interviews, new versions of pre-existing songs not released on any other CD, and original songs that have been released on previous CDs.

The album was the top-selling digital-only album of 2005.

Track listing

"iTunes Originals" 0:04
"Adia" 4:02
"Writing the First Song" 1:14
"Out of the Shadows" 4:58
"The First Song That Made Me Feel Good About Being a Song Writer" 1:17
"Ben's Song" 4:52
"A Pivotal Change and a Lesson Learned" 2:27
"The Path of Thorns (Terms)" 5:45
"A Stalker Song" 2:11
"Possession (iTunes Originals Version)" 4:29
"A Tragic Love Story" 0:50
"Hold On" 4:08
"Letting Go" 1:36
"Ice Cream (iTunes Originals Version)" 2:30
"There's no Mathematical Equation" 0:50
"Building A Mystery" 4:06
"Angel Emmylou" 1:57
"Angel (Live at Lilith Fair, with Emmylou Harris)" 5:55
"The First Step Towards Self-Reinvention" 1:26
"Fallen (iTunes Originals Version)" 3:32
"The First Truly Happy Love Song" 1:46
"Push (iTunes Originals Version)" 3:54
"Another Afterthought" 1:07
"Dirty Little Secret (iTunes Originals Version)" 3:26

References 

McLachlan, Sarah
2006 live albums
2006 compilation albums
Nettwerk Records live albums
Nettwerk Records compilation albums
Arista Records live albums
Arista Records compilation albums
Sarah McLachlan compilation albums
Sarah McLachlan live albums
Albums produced by Pierre Marchand